Brabants Landschap, officially Stichting het Noordbrabants Landschap, is one of the 12 provincial landscape foundations in the Netherlands.

History

Foundation 

Modern nature conservation in North Brabant province started with the acquisition of the Oisterwijk forests and fens by the society Vereniging Natuurmonumenten in 1913. While Natuurmonumenten was a very successful organization, it felt that many aspects of nature conservation could more effectively by handled at a provincial level. Indeed North Brabant had special worries, like the enormous drive to turn the last rough terrains into agricultural land.

In June 1931 the provincial executive of North Brabant then made a proposal to the provincial council to create a foundation called 'Het Noordbrabantsch Landschap'. It was to be modelled on the Utrechts Landschap (1927) and Geldersch Landschap (1929). The goal of the foundation was to promote nature and a beautiful landscape. The means to achieve this were to acquire, maintain and manage terrains. Natuurmonumenten would be willing to help establish such a foundation in North Brabant.

On 11 December 1931 'Het Noord-brabantsch Landschap' was constituted in 's-Hertogenbosch. The Queen's commissioner was president of the foundation, and there were at least 28 other board members. This large board was probably meant to represent all parts of the province. The selection included people who had earlier shown to be interested in nature conservation.

Early years 
In the early years the support for Brabants Landschap was not overwhelming. As a consequence, it could not do much more than knowledge work, like consulting and planning. Its means were too limited to acquire terrains. The foundation did organize activities like guided tours and exhibitions. An important function of the foundation was that its members (supporters), and those of comparable organizations had (free) access to many protected areas. The advisory work of the foundation led to some successes. During the execution of the commercial cultivation project that led to Landgoed de Utrecht of about 2,500 hectares, the area that is now the Mispeleindse Heide was spared. The appointment of Constant Kortmann as King's commissioner in 1959 was very favorable for Brabants Landschap. The province instituted a subsidy of 50% for acquisitions like those made by Brabants Landschap.

The first terrains are bought 
In 1961 Noord Brabants Landschap made a start with acquiring grounds. It bought a 4.5 hectares terrain in Baarschot with a mere known locally as Krantven. The second terrain was known as 'Het Zand' of about 1.5 hectares, and bordered the Oranjebond terrains south of Hilvarenbeek. Brabants Landschap also got in much better position, because the national government planned a prominent role for North Brabant in national tourism.

In June 1963 Brabants Landschap bought its first big terrain, the estate Ter Braakloop of 50 hectares. It forced the foundation to increase its efforts to acquire funding. In November 1963 the adjacent estate 'De Oude Hondsberg' followed, and so an estate of 140 hectares was formed near Oisterwijk. Soon it was followed by Nemerlaer Castle and its estate.

An influential organization 
In the mid-1960s the Brabants Landschap became an influential organization. It acquired more land and more supporters, making it a force to be reckoned with. In 1972 Brabants Landschap owned 2,400 hectares, and thought about taking a sharper stance on more general environmental issues like pollution. That year it had 3,627 supporters. In 1978 it published a book about the 4,000 hectares of terrain that it owned. In August 1987 Brabants Landschap had almost 10,000 hectares. However, on leaving the province, the Queen's commissioner Dries van Agt said that the province spend relative more money on roads than any other province. Meanwhile, North Brabant failed to protect its landscape, mainly because the political will was lacking in a province dominated by agricultural interests.

The agrarian landscape 
The landscape of North Brabant is a predominantly agricultural landscape. Brabants Landschap focuses on the whole landscape, but by acquiring land, it can only protect wild areas like forests, heath, water etc. The main part of provincial nature is found in the agricultural area. Here a landscape with hedges, grassland and sparse trees is home to many common species, but also connects the more wild areas of the province. It is in this agricultural zone that the main degradation of the landscape took place. One of the causes was land consolidation. Based on the land consolidation law of 1954, the parcels of many farms became larger, and were optimized for mechanization. It was not until about 1975 that it became normal for environmental organization to be involved in the process. In 1985 the land consolidation law was replaced by the  Nevertheless, even with formal environmental representation in the process, the environment continued to suffer. This was especially true in North Brabant, where the agricultural interests were very powerful.

Acid Rain 
Other specific challenges for North Brabant were acid rain and a manure crisis. The acid rain damage was heavy in the Peel, east of Eindhoven. This area suffered from its location near the West-German and Belgian heavy industries. However, the by far biggest cause of the problems in the Peel was intensive pig farming. This form of farming relies on importing food via the port of Rotterdam. Therefore, starting a pig farm only required a backyard large enough to build a stable. With a high degree of automation and a low degree of care, hordes of locals became pig farmers. Many became wealthy very fast, but by 1988 there were probably 3,000,000 pigs in the Peel. Soon the area was drowning in manure. There were all kinds of rules to limit manure deposition on the land, but these were often evaded. In the air the ammonia from the manure reacts with pollution like sulfur dioxide, and causes acid precipitation.

In 1983 local forest managers noted that trees became very vulnerable to fungus epidemics, and no longer recovered from caterpillar plagues. Brabants Landschap noted that local forest were dying and its heath turned yellow instead of purple. It contacted local municipalities to address the problem. Some were willing to limit pig farming. Other municipalities chose to ignore the problem, and even ignored national legislation which aimed to keep pig farms away from forests. One of the biggest obstacles for action were the many farmers who were members of a municipal council. It allowed the agricultural sector to effectively annul national and provincial agricultural policies on the local level.

Flood prevention 
In the 1990s drought became the next crisis in North Brabant. This was surprising, because the province has a huge annual precipitation surplus. The drought was caused by human interference. Land consolidation, the canalization of rivers and brooks, increased water consumption etc. are to blame. It led to a situation in which the heavy winter precipitation was discharged to the sea almost immediately. This was good for farmers, which could work the dry land with heavy machines in early Spring. It also promotes earlier growth of plants in Spring. The downside was that in Summer, the province and its farmers used massive amounts of groundwater. Brabants Landschap noted that the types of trees which had shallow roots were killed because their roots no longer reached the groundwater. In 1992 the province severely limited the farmers' use of groundwater in order to safeguard the future supply of drinking water.

The January 1995 high water on the Dutch Rhine, Meuse, and IJssel led to the evacuation of 250,000 people. The Dutch government came to understand that the temporary water storage capacity of rural areas had to be restored in order to prevent future disasters in the Dutch delta. It was obvious that this was essentially a local affair, which could hardly be directed from The Hague. Therefore, the national government provided funding, but engaged local organizations to achieve this objective. Brabants Landschap was one of these organizations. It was not as crucial as the water boards, but it played its part, and continues to do so.

Nature Network 
In 1990 the Dutch government coined the term  (EHS), now  (NNN) (Nature Network Netherlands). As the name implies, the idea was to consider the complete collection of nature reserves and other areas that are valuable for nature. These areas would be connected by wildlife corridors, so that species could migrate between these terrains instead of becoming extinct in isolation.

In 2013 the execution of Natuurnetwerk Nederland was delegated to the provinces. The local  aims to have 129.000 hectares of nature (a quarter of the province) and about 1,500 km of wildlife corridors by 2027. In practice, the execution of Natuurnetwerk Brabant is often integrated with the plans for flood prevention.

Brabants Landschap today

The organization 
This is a broad representation of Brabant Society, but it also contains local people with a passion for nature. The Algemeen Bestuur functions somewhat like a shareholder meeting. It appoints the supervisory board, and approves the annual report, the budget and general policy.

The  is like a supervisory board. It approves all real estate transactions, and appoints a chief executive officer. As of 15 April 2021, this is Joris Hogenboom. In 2020 there were 69 employees, 25 of these part-time. 23 worked in the office in Haaren, the others work outdoors.

The  (landscape coordination agency) is a distinct part of Brabants Landschap. The agency has 11 employees and coordinates policy and subsidies in the part of the province outside the Natuurnetwerk Brabant, i.e. in the agrarian part of the province. As such it executes provincial policies based on a contract with the province. The agency also supports volunteer activities in nature.

On a national level Brabants Landschap cooperates with many organizations. With the 11 other Provincial Landscapes it cooperates in LandschappenNL.

Communication and information 
In order to gather support for its mission, it is very important for Brabants Landschap to inform and educate people about nature in the province. In turn this should lead to the organization getting more supporters, which are like members. Brabants Landschap therefore still organizes guided tours for its members. It publishes walking routes online, and a magazine. Brabants Landschap also constructs on site information panels.

The future 
In 2021 there were two important policy themes for Brabants Landschap: the climate crisis, and the nitrogen crisis. The latter was a specific Dutch crisis, which broke out on 29 May 2019. That day, a verdict of the Council of State blocked about 18,000 building and infrastructure projects. The cause was the insufficient manner in which the government had handled the deposition of nitrogen compounds in Natura 2000 areas. About two-thirds of these were generated by agriculture. It is no coincidence that Behoud de Peel, which had been fighting acid rain in De Peel since 1978, was one of the two litigating parties that were proven right by the Council of State.

The Climate Crisis cannot be solved by Brabants Landschap, but it can manage some of the consequences. Some of these are the drought, and flooding caused by extreme weather (see above). The Nitrogen Crisis caused that the national government made funding available to end this crisis. One of the means to do this, is to buy the lands that are used by farms near Natura 2000 areas. Brabants Landschap faced some very busy years in 2021.

Areas owned by Brabants Landschap 
In 2020 Brabants Landschap owned about 110 terrains, totaling 18,762 hectares.

References

Notes

External links
 Website Brabants Landschap

Organisations based in North Brabant
Environmental organisations based in the Netherlands